Somogy FC was a Hungarian football club from the town of Kaposvár, Somogy County, Hungary. It was founded as Kaposvári AC in 1926.

History
Somogy FC debuted in the 1928–29 season of the Hungarian League and finished third.

Name Changes
1926: founded as Kaposvári AC
1926–1935 Somogy FC
1935: merger with Pécs-Baranya FC
1935–1936: Somogy Baranya FC
1936: dissolved

References

External links
 Profil

Football clubs in Hungary
Defunct football clubs in Hungary
1926 establishments in Hungary